The Human Condition is the second album by Scottish technical death metal band Man Must Die.

Track listing
"Intro" - 1:08
"Silent Observer" - 3:24
"March of the Clones" - 2:46
"Waster" - 4:11
"1000 Promises of Pain" - 5:00
"Cardboard Gangster" - 4:08
"Past the Point" - 4:55
"You Stand Alone" - 4:29
"Elitist" - 4:39
"Organized Insanity" - 3:19
"Suicide Gene" - 5:34

Credits
Joe McGlynn - vocals
Alan McFarland - guitar
Danny McNab - bass
John Lee - drums

References

2007 albums
Man Must Die albums
Relapse Records albums